Trans Canada Highway is an EP by Scottish electronic music duo Boards of Canada. Originally scheduled for release on 6 June 2006, it was released by Warp on 29 May 2006. It peaked at number 4 on the UK Independent Albums Chart, number 8 on the UK Dance Albums Chart, and number 12 on Billboards Top Dance/Electronic Albums chart.

Music videos
The opening track, "Dayvan Cowboy", also appeared on the duo's album The Campfire Headphase. Melissa Olson directed the music video for the track. The video pieces together stock footage of Joseph Kittinger's high-altitude parachute jumps for Project Excelsior and stock footage of surfer Laird Hamilton riding waves. In 2009, Pitchfork placed it at number 39 on their list of the "Top 50 Music Videos of the 2000s".

Covers
In 2011, Solange Knowles released a version of the track "Left Side Drive" with additional vocals. Knowles stated, "It's completely unofficial, and was just inspired by the song which I had a deep love affair with for years".

Track listing

Personnel
Credits adapted from liner notes.
 Mike Sandison – composition, performance, production (except track 6)
 Marcus Eoin – composition, performance, production (except track 6)
 D. Philip Madson – production (on track 6)
 Dee Kesler – strings (on track 6)
 Antonio Diaz – tape (on track 6)
 Boards of Canada – artwork, design

Charts

References

External links
 
 

2006 EPs
Boards of Canada albums
Warp (record label) EPs